Héctor Serrate (born 24 July 1946) is a Puerto Rican athlete. He competed in the men's triple jump at the 1968 Summer Olympics.

References

1946 births
Living people
Athletes (track and field) at the 1968 Summer Olympics
People from Santurce, Puerto Rico
Puerto Rican male triple jumpers
Olympic track and field athletes of Puerto Rico
Place of birth missing (living people)